The 2nd Canadian Women's Hockey League All-Star Game, took place on January 23, 2016 at Air Canada Centre in Toronto, Ontario, Canada. The game aired live on Sportsnet One in Canada as Team Black prevailed by a 5-1 tally against Team White.

The event featured three 20-minute periods. Among the players named as participants, Toronto Furies blueliner Sena Suzuki made history as the first international player (born outside of Canada and United States) to participate in the CWHL All-Star Game.

Participants

Fan balloting
Voting for CWHL all-star captains started in December 2015. Online voting required fans to vote on the CWHL.com web site. Fans were presented a list of 42 players and Natalie Spooner and Julie Chu were voted in as captains. Spooner was appointed as captain of Team White while Chu was named Team Black captain.

Game summary

References 

Canadian Women's Hockey League
2015 Canadian Womens Hockey League All-Star Game
2015–16 in Canadian women's ice hockey
2016 in Ontario
2010s in Toronto